D'Jais Bar & Grill is a popular dance club and restaurant in Belmar, New Jersey. It has been called a landmark, "infamous", and one of the most famous bars along the Jersey Shore.

Location and Name
D'Jais Bar & Grill is located at 1801-1805 Ocean Avenue, a street which runs north and south along the Belmar coastline. It is on the west side of the street, and the front entrance faces the beach and boardwalk. According to Frank Sementa, who has been the owner since 1979, the name "D'Jais" comes from the childhood nickname of the first owner of the club, Dominick Joseph DiSalvo, who was called "DJ".

History
 D'Jais was established in 1959. Locally, it has been called the most popular bar in town, and was busy from the start. D'Jais is still a popular spot  and has been called a "Jersey shore institution for young people". During the 1970s, D'Jais was also regular spot for Bruce Springsteen, who also took part in softball games and picnics hosted by the establishment, as well as singer and guitarist Bobby Bandiera. During that era, it was considered "the most celebrated of the bars across from the boardwalk", and was popularized for offering five six-ounce pilsner glasses of beer for a dollar. Local bands also played at the venue during the 70s, including Holme, whose members included Bobby Bandiera, Frank Sementa, and Kip Conner. It was purchased by Sementa, Luddecke, and Conner in 1979. They converted it from a bar famous for its live bands and cheap beer to a trendy dance club with a DJ, theme nights, and a party atmosphere.

In 1984, Monmouth County officials adopted a uniform 2 am closing time to discourage patrons from driving to other towns to find bars open later; however in 1986, D'Jais began closing at 12 am. Around 1990, Sementa added the restaurant to the site. In 2005, a study was conducted at the request of neighboring residents by the ABC board to analyze the bars operations and occupancy levels. The residents believed patrons of D'Jais had violated Quality of Life conditions. Residents were cited as spotting multiple fights, as well as other disruptive behavior.

Restaurant and dance club
The appearance of D'Jais has changed since the 1970s. The outdoor portion of the restaurant is covered by rooftop, and provides patrons with oceanview seating. The interior features four full-sized bars, as well as one that sits upon the outside deck. During the summer, most nights D'Jais features a DJ and dance music. There are frequently theme nights and contests. On Monday nights in the summer, Holme, a New Jersey band whose popularity dates back to the 1970s, entertains the crowd.

Notoriety
D'Jais is considered a landmark dance club and restaurant, and has been called many things, including "infamous" and "guido-central". D'Jais was named the best overall party spot and ranked 4th out of 100 in the 100 Best Bars at the Shore by Fun New Jersey. The club has attracted sports celebrities such as Kim Clijsters and Brian Lynch. Locally, it has been called the most popular bar in town, and a local hot spot.

New Jersey Sand Castle Contest
D'Jais is the lead sponsor of the annual New Jersey Sand Castle contest at the 18th Avenue beach. This contest typically attracts over 350 entries and about 10,000 participants each year.
D'Jais also participates in other local and regional charity events.

References

Sources

External links

New Jersey Sandcastle Competition

Nightclubs in New Jersey
Dance venues
Music venues in New Jersey
Belmar, New Jersey